Jalle is a boma in  Jalle payam, Bor North County, Jonglei State, South Sudan, about 58 kilometers northeast of Bor.  Since 2016, it has served as the county headquarters for Bor North County.

Demographics
According to the Fifth Population and Housing Census of Sudan, conducted in April 2008, Jalle boma had a population of 2,921 people, composed of 1,534 male and 1,387 female residents.

Notes

References 

Populated places in Jonglei State